Bryntirion Estate is an estate in Pretoria, South Africa. It incorporates the Mahlamba Ndlopfu residence of the president of South Africa, the vice president's residence (called the OR Tambo House), the presidential guest house, many homes of cabinet ministers, 15 tennis courts, and a 9 hole presidential golf course with a helipad.

The estate is 1.07 square kilometres (107 hectares or 264 acres). The perimeter security system includes 202 CCTV cameras, 4 gatehouses and 8.1 km of anti-climb motion detection fences. The perimeter fences cost R90 million (USD12.8 million) to build in 2007. R90 million for 8.1 km is approximately R11 million per kilometre or R11 000 per metre.

The Bryntirion Estate contains 28 erfs (properties). All the Bryntirion erven are owned by the Republic of South Africa except for erf 16.

Erf 16
Erf 16 is the only privately owned property that falls within the area which is referred to as the Bryntirion Estate. During 1993, Erf 16 was bought by a purchaser from the then government shortly before the first democratic elections. During 1997 another buyer purchased the property, which had been advertised for sale in the open market. At the time it was zoned for government use. The owner renovated and extended the house on the property. During 1999 the property was rezoned for use as a guest house. However, it has since then only been used as a family home. Government tried to expropriate erf 16 for security reasons. Mr Aboobaker challenged the expropriation and claimed he lost R12.5 million because of the unilateral decision to include his land in the estate.

References

External links
Google Maps for Bryntirion, Pretoria, South Africa
Google Maps for coordinates -25.739891, 28.226838

Politics of South Africa
Buildings and structures in Pretoria